Elie N'dekre (born January 1, 1992, in Abidjan) is an Ivorian football striker who plays for French club Trélissac.

Career
Elie Moises Akui N'dekre moved to France from Abidjan  with his parents at the age of seven in 1999. He played with the academy of Sevilla F.C., before signing with Bohemians 1905, a Czech Republic premiership club. In 2010, he went to Deportivo Alavés B, a Spanish league 2 club. In 2011, N'dekre to Esperence De Tunis, but agreement was not reached.

In 2015, Moises signed with the Latvian club, FS METTA/Latvijas Universitāte.

References
 https://web.archive.org/web/20150725020711/http://www.fsmetta.lv/cms/news/show/1459

External links

1992 births
Living people
Footballers from Abidjan
Ivorian footballers
Association football forwards
Balzan F.C. players
Bohemians 1905 players
FS METTA/Latvijas Universitāte players
SK Hanácká Slavia Kroměříž players